The Residences at Greenbelt – Manila Tower is a residential condominium skyscraper in Makati, Philippines. It is the third of three buildings constructed as part of The Residences at Greenbelt (TRAG) complex, and has a similar dimension to The Residences at Greenbelt - Laguna Tower.

The building has 48 floors above ground, which includes a 4-level podium with commercial establishments, and 3 basement levels for parking. It is considered to be one of the most prestigious residential building in the Philippines.

Location

The Residences at Greenbelt complex is located along Arnaiz Avenue (formerly known as Pasay Road), and the entire complex block is bounded by Paseo de Roxas, Greenbelt Drive and Esperanza Street. The complex was formerly the site of the old Coronado Lanes bowling center and parking lot. Being inside the Makati Central Business District, it is strategically located near malls, hotels, offices, school, and entertainment areas. As with its name, it is part of the Greenbelt Complex which includes the Greenbelt Mall. Just right across Greenbelt Drive is the Renaissance Makati City Hotel.

The Project Team

The Residences at Greenbelt – Manila Tower was masterplanned and designed by Architecture International, in cooperation with local architectural firm GF & Partners Architects, who also made the Space Planning consultancy services. Structural design for the building was provided by Aromin & Sy + Associates, and reviewed by international engineering firm Skilling Ward Magnusson Barkshire.

The buildings mechanical engineering works was designed by R.J. Calpo & Partners; electrical engineering works design & security consultancy was provided by R.A. Mojica & Partners. Sanitary / plumbing engineering design and fire protection design was provided by NBF Consulting Engineers.

Other members of the design team are E.A. Aurelio + ADI Ltd. Inc. (Landscape design); ALT Cladding & Design Philippines (Exterior Cladding); and Master Charlie Chao (Feng Shui Consultant).

The construction team is composed of Jose Aliling & Associates (Project / Construction Management); Davis Langdon & Seah Philippines Inc. (Quantity Surveying); and SKI Construction Group Inc. (General Contractor).

Property management is provided by Ayala Property Management Corporation.

During the construction phase, it is also known as the TRAG-3 Project.

See also

 The Residences at Greenbelt - Laguna Tower
 The Residences at Greenbelt - San Lorenzo Tower

References

External links
 TRAG - Manila Tower at Skyscraperpage.com

Skyscrapers in Makati
Residential skyscrapers in Metro Manila
Residential buildings completed in 2010